Go Tell the Spartans is a 1978 American war film directed by Ted Post and starring Burt Lancaster. The film is based on Daniel Ford's 1967 novel Incident at Muc Wa about U.S. Army military advisors during the early part of the Vietnam War in 1964, when Ford was a correspondent in Vietnam for The Nation.

Plot 
In 1964, infantry Major Asa Barker, a seasoned but weary veteran of World War II and Korean War, is given command of a poorly manned US Army advisor outpost overlooking three villages in South Vietnam. He is ordered to reoccupy a nearby deserted hamlet named Muc Wa on the Da Nang-to-Phnom Penh highway - which a decade ago had been the scene of a massacre of French soldiers during the First Indochina War.  

Barker and his executive officer, the career-orientated Captain Olivetti, get four replacements for the mission. Second Lieutenant Hamilton, who hopes volunteering for Vietnam is a way to being promoted after being passed over for promotion. The burnt-out First Sergeant Oleozewski, who served with Barker in Korea, and has already done three tours in Vietnam (his last assignment saw his previous unit massacred). Corporal Abraham Lincoln who is a combat medic and a drug addict. The fourth man mystifies Barker. Draftee Corporal Courcey is a demolitions expert who extended his enlistment by six months to serve in Vietnam. Maj. Barker sends the new men plus Corporal Ackley, a communications expert, to garrison Muc Wa with a half-French, half-Vietnamese interpreter/interrogation specialist named Nguyen "Cowboy". A hardcore squad of Hmong mercenaries and a motley mob of about 20 South Vietnamese Popular Force civilian "troops", equipped with various firearms.

After the group encounter a booby-trapped roadblock on the way to Muc Wa, they capture a lone Viet Cong soldier who is beheaded by Cowboy when the man refuses to divulge information. On arrival at the hamlet, Lt. Hamilton follows Oleozewski's defensive advice so the unit can be resupplied by helicopter. Courcey discovers the graveyard where 302 French soldiers were buried after being massacred by the Viet Minh. He translates a French inscription at the entrance as "Go, tell the Spartans, stranger passing by. That here, obedient to their laws, we lie" which references the Battle of Thermopylae. Courcey spots a one-eyed VC soldier scouting the area.

Courcey leads a patrol that finds Vietnamese women and children fishing along a small creek despite intelligence saying no civilians live in the area. Courcey befriends some of them despite the language barrier. That evening, the VC attack Muc Wa and Lincoln is wounded. Courcey leads an ambush patrol that kills a VC mortar crew, which included one of the women he spoke to earlier. The next morning, Barker travels to Saigon to meet Colonel Minh, the region's military leader, to request he send at least 300 ARVN troops to Muc Wa. However, Minh refuses claiming he needs the troops in Saigon to prevent a potential coup. Instead he corruptly offers the reinforcements in exchange for 1,500 artillery shells.

That evening, Muc Wa is attacked again. After ignoring Oleonozski's warnings, Lt. Hamilton is killed trying to rescue a badly wounded man who was left behind by a combat patrol. An anguished Oleonozski commits suicide the next day. When informed of the deaths, Barker wants to pull his troops out now that they lack an experienced leader, but this request is denied by General Harnitz forcing Barker to send Olivetti to Muc Wa. That night, the outpost is attacked again by a large force of well-armed Viet Cong, not the few dozen predicted by high command. US helicopter gunships arrive just in time to save the outpost from being overrun.

The next morning, Harnitz finally orders Barker to withdraw all American troops from Muc Wa, which is now believed to be besieged by the 1,000-strong 507th Viet Cong battalion. However, all the South Vietnamese and the walking wounded are to be left. Barker volunteers to stay and help evacuate these troops. Cowboy kills some Vietnamese civilians that Courcey brought into the base camp after they stole weapons and tried to escape. But a teenage girl, who Courcey tried to befriend, escapes and informs the VC of the Americans' evacuation plans. As night falls, Barker and Courcey begin the retreat from Muc Wa under the cover of friendly artillery fire. However, the group is ambushed and Barker is killed by the waiting VC, who are led by the same teenage girl. A wounded Courcey is hidden in bushes by an elderly militiaman.

The next morning, Courcey is the only survivor. He finds that Barker and the South Vietnamese militia soldiers have been stripped of their uniforms and weapons. A dazed Courcey staggers into the French graveyard where he encounters the one-eyed VC scout whom he had seen earlier. The badly wounded VC raises his rifle at Courcey before dropping it out of exhaustion. Courcey wanders out of the graveyard onto the dirt road leading away from the ruins of Muc Wa.

Cast

Burt Lancaster as Maj. Asa Barker
Craig Wasson as Cpl. Courcey
Jonathan Goldsmith as 1SG Oleonowski
Marc Singer as Capt. Olivetti
Joe Unger as Lt. Hamilton
Dennis Howard as Cpl. Abraham Lincoln
David Clennon as Lt. Finley Wattsberg
Evan C. Kim as Cpl. "Cowboy"
John Megna as Cpl. Ackley
Hilly Hicks as Signalman Toffee
Dolph Sweet as Gen. Harnitz
Clyde Kusatsu as Col. "Lard Ass" Minh
James Hong as Pvt. "Old Man"
Denice Kumagai as "Butterfly"
Tad Horino as "One-eyed Charlie" (Vietcong scout)
Phong Diep as Minh's Interpreter
Ralph Brannen as Col. Minh's ADC
Mark Carlton as Capt. Schlitz

Production

Development
Director Ted Post persuaded Avco Embassy Pictures to produce the film on a limited budget. He sent the script to a friend of Burt Lancaster, then 65 years old, who was recuperating from a knee injury (his character limps throughout the film). Calling the script brilliant, Lancaster agreed to star in it, and when the 31-day production budget ran short, he paid $150,000 to complete it. The younger actors cast were Marc Singer as infantry Captain Al Olivetti, a gung-ho career officer seeking to earn the Combat Infantryman Badge, and Craig Wasson as Corporal Courcey, the idealistic college-educated draftee who wants to see what a real war is like.

Writing
The story was inspired by a futile 1964 special-forces operation at Tan Hoa in the Central Highlands of Vietnam, an objective that turned out to be an abandoned settlement containing only a field, an abandoned airstrip and three or four French gravestones. The graves inspired the film's title, taken from Simonides's epitaph to the 300 soldiers killed in the Battle of Thermopylae against the Persians in 480 B.C.: "Go tell the Spartans, stranger passing by, that here, obedient to their laws, we lie." The film's name thus constitutes foreshadowing of the narrative arc, as the film's soldiers–like the Spartans at Thermopylae–are sent to their deaths.

The screenplay by Wendell Mayes was shopped around for years with various older leading men such as Robert Mitchum, William Holden and Paul Newman offered the role of Major Asa Barker. The project was turned down by Paramount and 20th Century Fox.

Unlike the elite US Army Special Forces of Ford's original novel, whom he called the "US Army Raiders", Mayes' screenplay of Military Assistance Advisory Group military advisors comprised a collection of misfits. A female reporter character in the novel was removed from the screenplay.

In 1977, the producers sought assistance from the U.S. Army, who responded that assistance would only be forthcoming if modifications to the script and characters were made. The Army response stated that its advisors to Vietnam in 1964 were "virtually all outstanding individuals, hand picked for their jobs, and quite experienced ... [I]n presenting an offhand collection of losers it is totally unrealistic of the Army in Vietnam in that period".

Filming
The film was made on location in Valencia, California.

Release
Go Tell the Spartans was released in the United States on June 14, 1978. In the Philippines, the film was released by Transamerica on November 14, 1978. It was re-released on September 7, 1987, and released on VHS cassette on May 13, 1992. It was released on DVD by HBO Home Video (through Warner Home Video) on August 30, 2005 and as a limited-edition Blu-ray by Scorpion Releasing in June 2016.

Reception
Though the film had a limited release in the United States, critics, especially those opposed to the Vietnam War, praised it: "In sure, swift strokes", wrote Arthur Schlesinger Jr. in the Saturday Review, "it shows the irrelevance of the American presence in Vietnam, the corruption wrought by that irrelevance, and the fortuity, cruelty, and waste of an irrelevant war." Stanley Kauffmann of The New Republic wrote in June 1978- 'This is the best film I've seen to date about the Vietnam War excepting two documentaries. Roger Grooms, in the Cincinnati Enquirer, judged it to be "one of the noblest films, ever, about men in crisis".

Over time, the previously overlooked film became an antiwar classic. At one of its revivals, it was described as:

A cult fave – and deservedly so – Go Tell the Spartans was hard-headed and brutally realistic about our dead-end presence in Vietnam; released the same year as Coming Home (United Artists) and The Deer Hunter (EMI Films released by Universal Pictures), the film won critical admiration, but audiences preferred individualised sagas, sentiment, and romantic melodrama. Rather than tackle the effects of the war on physically and emotionally wounded vets, this brave film exposed the fundamental, tactical lunacy of the war as perceived by an American officer (Burt Lancaster) who knows better, but must follow through on stupid, self-destructive orders from above. This is one of Lancaster's best performances: embittered, a cog in the military juggernaut, this good man foresees the killing waste to come.

Awards and nominations
In 1979, Wendell Mayes' screenplay was nominated for the Writers Guild of America Award for  "Best Drama Adapted from Another Medium (Screen)".

References

External links
 
 
 
 
 Daniel Ford on the novel and film

1977 films
1970s war drama films
American war drama films
Films directed by Ted Post
Vietnam War films
Films based on American novels
Films with screenplays by Wendell Mayes
American war epic films
Films set in Da Nang
Films set in Saigon
Embassy Pictures films
Films set in 1964
1977 drama films
1970s English-language films
1970s American films